The men's vault competition was one of eight events for male competitors in artistic gymnastics at the 1968 Summer Olympics in Mexico City. The event was held from 22 to 26 October at the Auditorio Nacional. There were 116 competitors from 28 nations, with nations in the team competition having up to 6 gymnasts and other nations entering up to 3 gymnasts. The event was won by Mikhail Voronin of the Soviet Union, the nation's fourth gold medal in the vault. Yukio Endo of Japan took silver, while Soviet Sergei Diomidov earned bronze.

Background

This was the 12th appearance of the event, which is one of the five apparatus events held every time there were apparatus events at the Summer Olympics (no apparatus events were held in 1900, 1908, 1912, or 1920). Three of the six finalists from 1964 returned: silver medalist Victor Lisitsky of the Soviet Union, bronze medalist Hannu Rantakari of Finland, and sixth-place finisher Yukio Endo of Japan. Reigning gold medalist and world champion Haruhiro Yamashita of Japan did not compete.

Ecuador made its debut in the men's vault; East and West Germany competed separately for the first time. The United States made its 11th appearance, most of any nation, having missed only the inaugural 1896 Games.

Competition format

Each nation entered a team of six gymnasts or up to three individual gymnasts. All entrants in the gymnastics competitions performed both a compulsory exercise and a voluntary exercise for each apparatus. The scores for all 12 exercises were summed to give an individual all-around score. (One gymnast who entered the all-around competition did not perform on the vault.) 

The event used a "vaulting horse" aligned parallel to the gymnast's run (rather than the modern "vaulting table" in use since 2004). These exercise scores were also used for qualification for the new apparatus finals. The two exercises (compulsory and voluntary) for each apparatus were summed to give an apparatus score; the top 6 in each apparatus participated in the finals; others were ranked 7th through 116th. In the final, each gymnast performed an additional voluntary exercise; half of the score from the preliminary carried over.

Schedule

All times are Central Standard Time (UTC-6)

Results

References

Official Olympic Report
www.gymnasticsresults.com
www.gymn-forum.net

Men's Vault
Men's 1968